"I Love You More and More Every Day" is a song written by Don Robertson and performed by Al Martino.  It was featured on his 1964 album I Love You More and More Every Day/Tears and Roses. The single was arranged by Peter DeAngelis and produced by Voyle Gilmore.

Chart performance
It reached #3 on the adult contemporary chart, #9 on the U.S. pop chart, and #11 on the Cashbox chart in 1964.  
The song ranked #73 on Billboard magazine's Top 100 singles of 1964.

Other charting versions
Joe Dolan covered the song in 1965, released on the Pye Label.  

Sonny James covered the song (as "I Love You More and More Everyday") in 1973, releasing a single that peaked at #3 on the Canadian country chart and #4 on the U.S. country chart.

Other versions
Lawrence Welk and His Orchestra released a version of the song on their 1964 album Early Hits of 1964.
Bob Braun released a version of the song on his 1965 album Introducing: Bob Braun.
Jean Shepard released a version of the song on her 1965 album It's a Man Every Time.
Kitty Wells released a version of the song on her 1973 album Yours Truly.
Marilyn Sellars released a version of the song on her 1975 album Gather Me.
Pat Boone released a version of the song on his 1980 compilation album Love Letters.
Foster and Allen released a version of the song on their 1992 compilation album Heart Strings.

References

1964 songs
1964 singles
1973 singles
Songs written by Don Robertson (songwriter)
Al Martino songs
Sonny James songs
Jean Shepard songs
Kitty Wells songs
Marilyn Sellars songs
Pat Boone songs
Capitol Records singles